Kyle Alexander Kuzma (born July 24, 1995) is an American professional basketball player for the Washington Wizards of the National Basketball Association (NBA). He played college basketball for the Utah Utes and was named first-team all-conference in the Pac-12 as a junior in 2016–17. Kuzma was selected in the first round of the 2017 NBA draft with the 27th overall pick, and he was named to the NBA All-Rookie First Team with the Los Angeles Lakers in 2018. He won an NBA championship with the Lakers in 2020 before being traded to the Wizards in 2021.

Early life
Raised in the Flint, Michigan area, Kuzma is the son of Karri Kuzma, a high school shot put champion who attended college on a track scholarship. He has a younger half-brother named Andre and a younger half-sister named Briana. Kuzma is biracial. Kuzma met his father only once as an infant, but viewed the father of his half-siblings, Larry Smith, as a father figure. Karri Kuzma and Smith put a toy basketball rim in the living room for Kyle when he was only two years old, thus igniting his passion for basketball.

Kuzma has described Flint as "a really violent place [where] there's a lot of temptation to get into the streets." However, Kuzma described basketball as his "safe haven". Kuzma attended Swartz Creek Community Schools and transferred to Bentley High School in Michigan, where he averaged 17.9 points, 14.4 rebounds, 3.8 assists and 3.4 blocks per game as a junior. As a high school senior at Rise Academy, Kuzma averaged 22 points and seven rebounds per game. Kuzma received offers to play with Division I schools including Connecticut, Iowa State, Tennessee, and Missouri, among others, before deciding on the University of Utah.

College career
Kuzma enrolled at the University of Utah in 2013. He redshirted his freshman year due to the fact that he signed late. He became a starter for the Utes in his sophomore year, when he averaged 10.8 points per game. As a junior in 2016–17, he averaged 16.4 points, 9.3 rebounds, and 2.4 assists per game, which earned him first-team All-Pac-12 honors. After the season, Kuzma decided to enter the 2017 NBA draft, foregoing his final year of college basketball eligibility. Kuzma graduated from the University of Utah with a degree in sociology.

Professional career

Los Angeles Lakers (2017–2021)
Kuzma was selected with the 27th overall pick in the 2017 NBA draft by the Brooklyn Nets. In a draft-day trade, he was dealt along with Brook Lopez to the Los Angeles Lakers in exchange for D'Angelo Russell and Timofey Mozgov. Prior to the draft, Kuzma had been projected to go in the second round. On July 3, 2017, he signed his rookie scale contract with the Lakers.

During the seven games he played for the Lakers (starting in six of the games) in the 2017 NBA Summer League, Kuzma led the team in points scored and became a consistent presence during the event. He recorded averages of 21.9 points, 6.4 rebounds, 2.7 assists, 1.4 blocks, and 1.1 steals per game and was named to the All-Summer League Second Team that year. He was also named the Summer League Championship Game MVP after recording a double-double of 30 points and 10 rebounds in a 110–98 win over the Portland Trail Blazers in the championship match.

On November 3, 2017, in his first game as a starter, he notched his first double-double, with 21 points and 13 rebounds, in a 124–112 win over the Brooklyn Nets. On November 17, he recorded another double-double by scoring 30 points, to go with 10 rebounds, in a 122–113 loss to the Phoenix Suns. Kuzma was named the Western Conference Rookie of the Month for games played in October/November. In 20 games, he averaged a team-high 16.7 points while shooting 50.4 percent overall and a team-leading 37.9 percent on three-point field goals. He was the first ever NBA rookie to compile at least 330 points, 120 rebounds, and 30 made three-pointers in his first 20 games. He was also just the sixth non-lottery pick to win the award in the first month of his career. On December 20, he scored a career-high 38 points on 70% shooting in a 122–116 win over Houston, ending the Rockets' 14-game winning streak. In the following game, he had a team-high 27 points in a 113–106 loss versus the Golden State Warriors to become the first Lakers rookie since Jerry West in 1961 to have scored 25 or more points in three straight games. He played in the Rising Stars Challenge during the 2018 NBA All-Star Weekend, and he was named to the NBA All-Rookie First Team at the end of the season.

On October 22, 2018, Kuzma scored a season-high 37 points against the San Antonio Spurs in a 143–142 overtime loss. On January 9, 2019, he scored a career-high 41 points against the Detroit Pistons in a 113–100 win. He was selected again for the Rising Stars game and earned MVP honors after scoring a game-high 35 points.

On August 10, 2020, Kuzma scored a game-winning three pointer to lift the Lakers to a 124–121 win over the Denver Nuggets, to cap off his 25 point night. In the postseason, he scored a career playoff high 19 points in Game 3 of the NBA Finals, in a 115–104 loss against the Miami Heat. The Lakers won the series 4–2 to tie the league high with their 17th NBA championship.

On December 21, 2020, Kuzma signed a three-year, $40 million contract extension with the Lakers.

Washington Wizards (2021–present)
On August 6, 2021, Kuzma was traded to the Washington Wizards as part of a package for Russell Westbrook. Kuzma made his Wizards debut on October 20, recording eleven points, 15 rebounds and three assists in a 98–83 win over the Toronto Raptors. On November 10, he made four three pointers in the fourth quarter of a game against the Cleveland Cavaliers, including two in the final 30 seconds to elevate the Wizards to a 97–94 win. On December 8, Kuzma recorded 26 points, seven rebounds, four assists and hit a game-winning three-pointer in a 119–116 win over the Detroit Pistons. On January 3, 2022, he scored a season-high 36 points, alongside 14 rebounds and six assists, in a 124–121 win over the Charlotte Hornets. On January 9, Kuzma grabbed a career-high 22 rebounds, alongside 27 points, in a 102–100 win over the Orlando Magic. On February 10, he recorded his first career triple-double in a 113–112 win over the Brooklyn Nets, scoring 15 points while adding 13 rebounds and 10 assists. On February 25, Kuzma tied his season high of 36 points, alongside eight rebounds, seven assists and two steals, in a 157–153 double overtime loss to the San Antonio Spurs.

On January 11, 2023, Kuzma scored 21 points and made a game-winning three-pointer in a 100–97 win over the Chicago Bulls. The next game, Kuzma scored a season-high 40 points, along with seven rebounds and seven assists in a 112–108 loss against the New York Knicks.

Career statistics

NBA

Regular season

|-
| style="text-align:left;"|
| style="text-align:left;"|L.A. Lakers
| 77 || 37 || 31.2|| .450 || .366 || .707 || 6.3 || 1.8 || .6 || .4 || 16.1
|-
| style="text-align:left;"|
| style="text-align:left;"|L.A. Lakers
| 70 || 68 || 33.1 || .456 || .303 || .752 || 5.5 || 2.5 || .6 || .4 || 18.7
|-
| style="text-align:left; background:#afe6ba;"|
| style="text-align:left;"|L.A. Lakers
| 61 || 9 || 25.0 || .436 || .316 || .735 || 4.5 || 1.3 || .5 || .4 || 12.8
|-
| style="text-align:left;"|
| style="text-align:left;"|L.A. Lakers
| 68 || 32 || 28.7 || .443 || .361 || .691 || 6.1 || 1.9 || .5 || .6 || 12.9
|-
| style="text-align:left;"|
| style="text-align:left;"|Washington
| 66 || 66 || 33.4 || .452 || .341 || .712 || 8.5 || 3.5 || .6 || .9 || 17.1
|- class="sortbottom"
| style="text-align:center;" colspan="2"|Career
| 342 || 212 || 30.4 || .449 || .339 || .723 || 6.2 || 2.2 || .6 || .5 || 15.6

Playoffs

|-
| style="text-align:left; background:#afe6ba;"|2020
| style="text-align:left;"|L.A. Lakers
| style="background:#cfecec;"| 21* || 0 || 23.0 || .430 || .313 || .784 || 3.1 || .8 || .3 || .3 || 10.0
|-
| style="text-align:left;"|2021
| style="text-align:left;"|L.A. Lakers
| 6 || 0 || 21.5 || .292 || .174 || .667 || 3.8 || 1.2 || .3 || .2 || 6.3
|- class="sortbottom"
| style="text-align:center;" colspan="2"|Career
| 27 || 0 || 22.7 || .401 || .283 || .761 || 3.3 || .9 || .3 || .3 || 9.1

College

|-
| style="text-align:left;"|2014–15
| style="text-align:left;"|Utah
| 31 || 0 || 8.1 || .456 || .324 || .556 || 1.8 || .6 || .0 || .2 || 3.3
|-
| style="text-align:left;"|2015–16
| style="text-align:left;"|Utah
| 36 || 35 || 24.1 || .522 || .255 || .611 || 5.7 || 1.4 || .3 || .4 || 10.8
|-
| style="text-align:left;"|2016–17
| style="text-align:left;"|Utah
| 29 || 29 || 30.8 || .504 || .321 || .669 || 9.3 || 2.4 || .6 || .5 || 16.4
|- class="sortbottom"
| style="text-align:center;" colspan="2"|Career
| 96 || 64 || 21.0 || .506 || .302 || .631 || 5.6 || 1.5 || .3 || .4 || 10.1

Awards and honors
NBA
 NBA Rising Stars Challenge MVP (2019)
 2× Rising Stars Challenge (2018, 2019)
 NBA All-Rookie First Team (2018)
College
 First-team All-Pac-12 (2017)

Personal life
Kuzma has been in a relationship with Canadian model Winnie Harlow since 2020.

References

External links

 Utah Utes bio

1995 births
Living people
21st-century African-American sportspeople
African-American basketball players
American men's basketball players
Basketball players from Flint, Michigan
Basketball players from Philadelphia
Brooklyn Nets draft picks
Los Angeles Lakers players
Power forwards (basketball)
Small forwards
Utah Utes men's basketball players
Washington Wizards players